West Washington Junior-Senior High School is a public high school located in Campbellsburg, Indiana.

Athletics
West Washington Junior-Senior High School's athletic teams are the Senators and they compete in the Patoka Lake Athletic Conference. The school offers a wide range of athletics including:

Baseball
Basketball
Cross Country
Football
Golf
Softball
Track and Field
Volleyball
Wrestling

Wrestling
The 2017 season was the first ever for the school, and senior Griffin Packwood (wt. 220) advanced to the Semi-State Championship.

The 2018 season was the first ever for Jr. High, with junior Caleb Murphy (wt. 220) and senior Jude Livers (wt. 120) advancing to the Regional Championship, with Caleb Murphy making it the Semi-State Championship.

The 2019 season the first for students in the elementary, and freshman Wyatt Johnston (wt. 113) and junior Landon Pearson (wt. 285) advanced to the Regional Championship.

The 2022 season had two seniors Wyatt Johnston (wt. 152) and Mason Jones (wt. 113) both reaching 100 career varsity wins, a school record.  Wyatt was also the first sectional champion in school history.  Both Wyatt and Mason advanced the Semi-State.

Football
The 1993-94 Football team, led by Head Coach Todd Pritchett, went 11-3 overall (4-0 in conference play) and lost in the State Championship of the 1993-94 IHSAA Football State Tournament (Class 1A). The team lost 16–37 against North Miami Middle/High School

The 2015–16 Football team, led by Head Coach Phillip Bowsman, went 11-1 overall (5–0 in conference play) and lost in the Regional Championship of the 2015–16 IHSAA Football State Tournament (Class 1A). The team lost 13–35 against Linton-Stockton High School.

The 2019-20 Football team, led by Head Coach Phillip Bowsman, went 12-2 overall (7–0 in conference play), winning both the Sectional and Regional Championship games in Class 1A. The Senators lost in the Semi State Championship to Covenant Christian High School.

Year-by-Year Results

Yearly record

2020:   11–1, Regional Champions

2019:   12–2, Regional Champions

2018:   9–3

2017:   5-5

2016:  11–1

2015:  11–1, Sectional Champions

2014:   5-5

2013:   5-6

2012:   9–4, Sectional Champions

2011:   5-5

2010:   9–3

2009:   5-5

2008:   6-5

2007:   3-7

2006:   4-5

2005:   8–4

2004:   9–3

2003:   5-6

2002:   5-6

2001:   4-7

2000:   8–4

1999:   3-8

1998:   5-6

1997:   6-4

1996:   7-3

1995:   5-4

1994:  11–2, Regional Champions

1993:  11–3, Semi-State Champions

1992:   2-7

1991:   1-8

1990:   1-9

1989:   3-7

1988:   0-9

1987:   2-7

1986:   0-9

1985:   2-7

1984:   7-3

1983:   2-7

1982:   2-8

1981:   6-4

1980:   2-8

1979:   3-6

1978:   0-9

1977:   3-6

1976:  10-0

1975:   5-5

1974:   4-6

1973:   0-8

See also
 List of high schools in Indiana

References

External links
Official Website

Public high schools in Indiana
Schools in Washington County, Indiana